Jentrix Shikangwa Milimu (born 27 November 2001), known as Jentrix Shikangwa, is a Kenyan footballer who plays as a forward for Simba Queens  and the Kenya women's national team.

Club career 
By end January 2022, she moved to Turkey, and joined the newly established Fatih Karagümrük to playe in the 2021-22 Women's Super League. She scored six goals in 19 league matches in the 2021-22 season.

International career 
Shikangwa capped for Kenya at senior level during the 2019 CECAFA Women's Championship and the 2020 Turkish Women's Cup.

See also 
List of Kenya women's international footballers

References

External links 

2001 births
Living people
People from Kakamega
Kenyan women's footballers
Women's association football forwards
Kenya women's international footballers
Kenyan expatriate footballers
Expatriate women's footballers in Turkey
Kenyan expatriate sportspeople in Turkey
Fatih Karagümrük S.K. (women's football) players
Turkish Women's Football Super League players